Classical Academy can refer to

The Classical Academy High School (California)
The Classical Academy (Colorado)
Classical Academy, Texas, a member of the Texas Association of Private and Parochial Schools